The 1994–95 National Soccer League season, was the 19th season of the National Soccer League in Australia. The season ended with Melbourne Knights winning the championship and minor premiership double.

Changes from 1993–94
In August 1994 the Australian Soccer Federation (ASF) announced to mixed reaction that all regular season league matches would be decided by penalty shootout if the game was drawn at the end of 90 minutes of play. Four points were awarded for a win, two for a win on penalties, one for a penalty loss and no points for a loss in regulation time.

Teams
Prior to the start of the season, the Newcastle Breakers withdrew from the competition citing financial difficulties. The withdrawal of the Breakers left 13 teams, meaning each team had two byes for the season.

Regular season

League table

Finals series

Individual awards
Player of the Year: Mark Viduka (Melbourne Knights)
U-21 Player of the Year: Mark Viduka (Melbourne Knights)
Top Scorer: Mark Viduka (Melbourne Knights) – 18 goals
Coach of the Year: Zoran Matic (Adelaide City)

Notes

References
- NSL Awards
Australia - List of final tables (RSSSF)

National Soccer League (Australia) seasons
1994 in Australian soccer
1995 in Australian soccer
Aus
Aus